This is a list of software for various operating systems for playing Amiga music formats.

Audacious (various third party plugins have been written to play Amiga formats)
DeliPlayer
Dual Module Player
Flash MOD Player (AS3) - A fully featured module player targeted at game developers. 
FlashMod Player (Alchemy/AS3) - A simple multiplattform modplayer using Flash. 
Foobar2000 (various third party plugins have been written to play Amiga formats)
InertiaPlayer - one of the earliest PC MOD players released in 1993
JavaMod - A multiplattform modplayer using java
hxMikMod, a haXe/Flash port of libmikmod
MikMod
ModPlug Player
NostalgicPlayer Windows player by the same author as APlayer on the Amiga
Chron-O-Loo Web/WebAudio player based on UADE
OpenCubicPlayer - GPL licensed and one of the earliest PC player
SAM MOD Player - MOD player for Z80 powered SAM Coupé
TiMidity
TRAXMOD - A battery-powered portable MOD player for PIC32/ARM microcontrollers.
Unix Amiga Delitracker Emulator
VLC Media Player
WebXmp Web/WebAudio player based on XMP
Winamp (various third party plugins have been written to play Amiga formats)
XMMS (various third party plugins have been written to play Amiga formats)
XMP
XMPlay
WebAudio Mod Player JavaScript based mod player for MOD, XM & S3M. (also on Github)
uFMOD - free XM library and player for Windows, Linux, FreeBSD and KolibriOS

See also

 MOD file format
 Tracker file

References 

Amiga music formats